Scot Hollonbeck (born 1969) is an American wheelchair racer, who competed at the Olympic and Paralympic level. At the 1996 Olympic Games, he placed second in the 1500m wheelchair racing event. 2000 Summer Olympic Games, he placed sixth in the 1500m wheelchair racing event. At the 2004 Olympic Games, he finished 4th in the 1500m wheelchair racing event. Men's 1500m wheelchair.  At the 1992 Olympic Games, he finished 5th in the 1500m wheelchair racing event. Men's 1500m wheelchairHe competed in four consecutive Summer Olympic finals, winning one silver medal and Summer Paralympics from 1992 to 2004, winning a total of two gold and three silver medals.

Hollonbeck became a paraplegic at age 14 after being hit by a van while bicycling to swim practice. Only days after the accident, while still in the hospital, he watched a wheelchair race on television where Sharon Hedrick broke the world record in the 800 meters. Having been a competitive runner he immediately became interested in the sport and attended a camp for disabled athletes at the University of Illinois the next summer.

While attending Rochelle Township High School in Rochelle, Illinois, he was a member of the school's track and field team. As a sophomore, he was allowed to race in a wheelchair division.  As the only wheeler he often raced in mixed heats with runners, the wheeler and runner heats were scored separately. For his last two years of high school, however, the school barred him from competing in mixed heats with runners because of safety issues. Despite the fact that Scot trained every day with the runner in mixed practices, he was deemed "unsafe" during competition.  In 1987 Hollonbeck filed a lawsuit against the school system.  This was the first case in the country concerning the right for disabled students to compete on their school teams.  In late 1988, after he had graduated from the school, a federal judge ruled that school officials had violated his civil rights, as provided for in the Rehabilitation Act of 1973, by not allowing him to argue his case. The judge did not rule on whether high school wheelchair athletes should be able to compete alongside or against their non-disabled peers.

Hollonbeck received an athletic scholarship to the University of Illinois and was a member of the school's wheelchair basketball and track and field teams. He later moved to Atlanta, Georgia to work for The Coca-Cola Company in the Worldwide Sports Department.  He continues to be a disabled sports policy expert and access advocate.

References

External links 
 

1969 births
Living people
Athletes (track and field) at the 1996 Summer Paralympics
Illinois Fighting Illini Paralympic athletes
Olympic wheelchair racers of the United States
Paralympic track and field athletes of the United States
Paralympic silver medalists for the United States
People from Rochelle, Illinois
Sportspeople from Illinois
Wheelchair racers at the 2004 Summer Olympics
Wheelchair racers at the 1992 Summer Olympics
Wheelchair racers at the 1996 Summer Olympics
Wheelchair racers at the 2000 Summer Olympics
American male wheelchair racers
People with paraplegia
Paralympic wheelchair racers
Medalists at the 1992 Summer Paralympics
Medalists at the 1996 Summer Paralympics
Paralympic gold medalists for the United States
Paralympic medalists in athletics (track and field)